Hrê is a North Bahnaric language of central Vietnam. At the 2009 census, there were 127,000 ethnic Hrê.

References

Languages of Vietnam
Bahnaric languages